A by-election occurred for the Australian House of Representatives seat of Balaclava on 3 August 1929. This was triggered by the resignation of Nationalist MP and former Speaker William Watt.

The by-election was won by Nationalist candidate Thomas White.

Results

References

1929 elections in Australia
Victorian federal by-elections
1920s in Victoria (Australia)